WBOC-FM (102.5 MHz) is a radio station that broadcasts a Top 40/CHR format. Licensed to Princess Anne, Maryland, United States, the station is owned by the Draper Holdings Business Trust, as part of a cluster with CBS/Fox affiliate WBOC-TV (channel 16), NBC affiliate WRDE-LD (channel 31), Telemundo affiliate WBOC-LD (channel 42), and sister radio stations WCEM-FM, WTDK, WCEM, WAAI and WRDE-FM.

History

The station went on the air December 24, 1976 as WOLC, a religious station owned by Maranatha, Inc. (not to be confused with the unrelated Maranatha Broadcasting Company, the owners of WFMZ-TV in Allentown, Pennsylvania). In August 2015, Maranatha agreed to sell WOLC to Draper Holdings Business Trust, owner of WBOC-TV, and took the station off the air on August 18. Draper moved WOLC's studios from Princess Anne to the Salisbury studios of WBOC-TV, using the space formerly occupied by the former WBOC radio (now WTGM and WQHQ); it also announced that the station would introduce a format that, while not yet chosen, would include news, weather, and sports content from WBOC-TV. Draper also filed to change the station's call letters to WBOC-FM. The sale was completed on November 10, 2015, at a purchase price of $650,000; the change to WBOC-FM took effect at that time. The station returned to the air on November 20, and aired Christmas music without commercials through the holiday season. WBOC-FM launched its eventual adult contemporary format on December 31, 2015.

WBOC-FM started leaning towards Top 40/CHR in March of 2022 and rebranded as "Delmarva's Hit Music Station" to fill a CHR hole in the market when WOCQ flipped to country in March of 2022.

References

External links
102.5 WBOC Online

BOC-FM
Radio stations established in 1976
1976 establishments in Maryland
Contemporary hit radio stations in the United States